On the Avenue is the third studio album by American organist Ronnie Foster recorded in 1974 and released on the Blue Note label.

Reception
The Allmusic review by Jason Ankeny awarded the album 4½ stars and stated "Though not as relentlessly funky as his classic Blue Note debut Two Headed Freap, On the Avenue remains the most accomplished record of Ronnie Foster's career, proving commercial aspirations and accoutrements can indeed co-exist alongside traditional jazz sensibilities".

Track listing

Recorded at Electric Lady Studios in New York City on April 30 (tracks 1-3, 5 & 6) and May 1 (tracks 4 & 7), 1974

Personnel
Ronnie Foster - organ, clavinet, synthesizer, vocals 
John E. Gatchell, Dean Robert Pratt - trumpet, flugelhorn
Gerald Ray Chamberlain - trombone
Joel L. Kaye - baritone saxophone
Phil Upchurch - guitar, electric bass
Marvin Chappell - drums
Ray Armando - percussion
Alfred "Pee Wee" Ellis - horn arranger

References 

Blue Note Records albums
Ronnie Foster albums
1974 albums
Albums recorded at Electric Lady Studios